A roll-your-own (RYO) cigarette, also called a handrolled cigarette, is a cigarette made from loose tobacco (usually a shag cut) and rolling paper. Factory-made cigarettes are called industrial cigarettes.

Rolling tobacco
Rolling tobacco, or cigarette tobacco, is the primary tobacco used for RYO cigarettes. It is generally packaged in pouches. 

After 2009, the United States federal tax rate on RYO tobacco was raised from $1.0969 per pound to $24.78 per pound.  This increase has caused many people to switch to using pipe tobacco to make cigarettes, since the pipe tobacco tax rate was also increased, but only to $2.83 per pound.

In Australia, loose tobacco was taxed less than manufactured cigarettes until September 2016.

Prevalence

RYO has become more popular in the United States in recent years, but relatively few smokers, only 6.7%, actually roll their own cigarettes. In contrast, this rate was 15% in Canada, 22% in Australia, and 30% in the UK. Reasons for this difference include the generally lower price of traditional cigarettes in most states in the US compared to Canada and Europe.

See also
 Do it yourself
 Joint (cannabis)
 List of rolling papers
 Shag (tobacco)
 Tobacco smoking

References

External links
  US tax code definitions

Cigarettes